Lanjigarh is a town in Lanjigarh Tehsil in Kalahandi district in Odisha State. Lanjigarh is 58 km away from Bhawanipatna and 430 km from Bhubaneswar.

References

Cities and towns in Kalahandi district